Kozlovo is a rural locality (a village) in Razinskoye Rural Settlement, Kharovsky District, Vologda Oblast, Russia. The population was 2 as of 2002.

Geography 
Kozlovo is located 54 km north of Kharovsk (the district's administrative centre) by road. Oleshkovo is the nearest rural locality.

References 

Rural localities in Kharovsky District